= Ignacy Sobieszczański =

Polish engineer (1872–1952)

Ignacy Sobieszczański (1872–1952) was a Polish engineer, activist, and an emigree to Siberia during the late Russian Empire. He became an important prospector and merchant in Siberia in the early 20th century.
